Our Lady of Kibeho, also known as Our Lady of Sorrows of Kibeho, is a Catholic title of the Mary, mother of Jesus, based on the Marian apparitions reported in the 1980s by several adolescents in Kibeho, south-western Rwanda. The young visionaries were Alphonsine Mumureke, Nathalie Mukamazimpaka and Marie Claire Mukangango.

The Kibeho apparitions apparently communicated various messages to the schoolgirls, including an apocalyptic vision of Rwanda descending into violence and hatred, possibly foretelling the 1994 Rwandan genocide.

In 2001, the local bishop of the Catholic Church officially recognised the visions of three schoolgirls as authentic. The Holy See also released the declaration of Bishop Augustin Misago of Gikongoro approving the apparitions.

Marian apparitions
Kibeho is a small village located in southwestern Rwanda. The reported apparitions there began on November 28, 1981, at a time of increasing tension between the Tutsi and Hutu groups. They occurred at Kibeho College, a secondary school for girls, and included an apocalyptic vision of Rwanda descending into violence and hatred which many believe foretold the 1994 Rwandan genocide.

Several times in the 1980s, the Virgin Mary was said to have appeared to three young women. The Virgin identified herself as Nyina wa Jambo (Kinyarwanda for “Mother of the Word”), which was synonymous with Umubyeyi W'Imana ("Mother of God"). The teenaged seers reported that the Virgin asked everyone to pray to prevent a terrible war. In the vision of August 19, 1982, they all reported seeing violence, dismembered corpses, and destruction.

The longest series of visions were attributed to Alphonsine Mumureke, who had received the initial vision shortly after her admittance into Kibeho High School in October 1981 after her primary education, and the last on November 28, 1989. Anathalie Mukamazimpaka was the next one to have visions, which lasted from January 1982 to December 3, 1983. These emphasised endless prayer and expiation, with the Virgin even instructing Mukamazimpaka to perform penances through mortification of the flesh. Marie Claire Mukangango, who had initially bullied Mumureke at school because of the visions, herself experienced apparitions which lasted from March 2 to September 15, 1982. The Virgin told Mukangango that people should pray the Chaplet of the Seven Sorrows to obtain the favor of repentance.

During his 1990 visit to Rwanda, Pope John Paul II visited Mbare, Kamonyi and Nyandungu. He exhorted the faithful to turn to the Virgin Mary as a “simple and sure guide” and to pray for greater commitment against local divisions, both political and ethnic.

Links with the Genocide
In the 100 days that followed the April 6, 1994 assassination of dictator and President of Rwanda Juvénal Habyarimana, 800,000 to over a million Rwandans were slaughtered by their countrymen and, in some cases, their next-door-neighbors. The Genocide was the culmination of intensifying animosity between the two ethnic groups – the Hutus and Tutsis – and the civil war that had preceded it. Kibeho itself was the site of two huge massacres: the first at the parish church in April 1994, and the second a year later where more than 5,000 refugees who had taken shelter there were shot by soldiers. Marie Claire Mukangango and her husband, Elie Ntabadahiga, were trapped in Kigali and were among those killed in the April 1994 massacre.

Approved visionaries
Only the visions of the first three seers (Alphonsine Mumureke, Nathalie Mukamazimpaka, and Marie Clare Mukangango, aged 17, 20, and 21, respectively) received the solemn approval of Augustin Misago, Bishop of Gikongoro.

Unapproved visionaries
Others who claimed to have similar visions but are not recognised by the Catholic Church were Stephanie Mukamurenzi, Agnes Kamagaju, Vestine Salima, and Emmanuel Segastashya, the last of whom was previously a pagan and became a Christian evangelist. Segastashya's alleged visions included meeting Christ in a beanfield.

Interpretation
The visions may be regarded as an ominous foreshadowing of the Rwandan genocide, and particularly the second Kibeho massacre in 1995. The school where the visions occurred became a place of slaughter during the Genocide, as dozens of children were shot and hacked to death by Hutu terrorists. The visionaries had either managed to flee the violence or were among the casualties.

Church approval
Augustin Misago, the Bishop of Gikongoro, approved public devotion linked to the apparitions on 15 August 1988 (the Solemnity of the Assumption of Mary) and declared their authenticity on 29 June 2001. He was accused in 1999 of involvement in the Rwandan Genocide, and acquitted on 24 June of the following year. As early as 1982, an earlier bishop of the diocese, Bishop Jean Baptiste Gahamanyi, already authorized public devotion.

On July 2, 2001, the Holy See also released the declaration of Bishop Augustin Misago of Gikongoro approving the apparitions.

The feast day of Our Lady of Kibeho is on November 28, the anniversary of the first apparition to Alphonsine Mumureke in 1981.

Marian shrine

The Marian sanctuary at Kibeho was named "Shrine of Our Lady of Sorrows" in 1992. The first stone was laid on 28 November 1992. In a 2003 agreement between the local ordinary and the Society of the Catholic Apostolate (Pallotines), the rectorate of the Shrine of Our Lady of Kibeho is entrusted to the Pallotine Fathers. The rector is appointed by the local bishop and the Regional Pallottine Rector.

Cultural references
American playwright Katori Hall dramatized the events surrounding the apparitions in Our Lady of Kibeho, produced in New York in 2014.

See also
 Marian apparitions
 Our Lady of Sorrows
 Kibeho massacre

References

Further reading
 Ilibagiza, Immaculée The Story of Jesus and Mary in Kibeho: A Prophecy Fulfilled. Immaculee.com; 1st edition (January 12, 2018). 
 Ilibagiza, Immaculée (with Steve Erwin); Our Lady of Kibeho: Mary Speaks to the World from the Heart of Africa. Carlsbad, CA: Hay House, 2008. 
 Ilibagiza, Immaculée (with Steve Erwin); The Boy Who Met Jesus: Segatashya Emmanuel of Kibeho. Carlsbad, CA: Hay House, 2012. 
 Biziyaremye, Gilbert; Mary Mother of the Word: Theological and Spiritual Meaning of the Title "Mother of the Word" in the Apparitions of Kibeho.  Independently published, 2020. 
 Biziyaremye, Gilbert; Apparitions of Kibeho: A Divine Mother's Plea for an Unwawering Faith, Sincere Conversion and Unceasing Prayer. Independently published, 2021. 
 Casimir, Ruzindaza; The Fascinating Story of Kibeho: Mary's Prophetic Tears in Rwanda. Blessed Hope Publishing, 2022.

External links
Sanctuary of Our Lady of Kibeho – Official website
The apparitions in Kibeho, Rwanda (1981-1989)
Video 1 of the Kibeho apparitions
Video 2 of the Kibeho apparitions
Book: "Our Lady of Kibeho – Mary speaks to the World from the Heart of Africa"
DVD Documentary: "If Only We Had Listened" – Kibeho apparitions
Witness to Genocide – A personal account of the 1995 Kibeho massacre

Shrines to the Virgin Mary
Marian apparitions
Rwandan genocide